Josef Tomášek (10 March 1904 – 15 April 1979) was a Czech water polo player. He competed in the men's tournament at the 1924 Summer Olympics.

References

External links
 

1904 births
1979 deaths
Czechoslovak male water polo players
Olympic water polo players of Czechoslovakia
Water polo players at the 1924 Summer Olympics
Sportspeople from Prague